John Marius Rodenburg  is Professor in the Department of Electronic and Electrical Engineering at the University of Sheffield.

Education
Rodenburg was educated at University of Exeter where he was awarded a Bachelor of Science degree in Physics with Electronics. He moved to the Cavendish Laboratory to complete his PhD on the detection and interpretation of electron diffraction patterns which was awarded by the University of Cambridge in 1986.

Career and research
Rodenburg's research interests are in microscopy, materials analysis and the use of ptychography and algorithms for phase retrieval.
He co-founded Phase Focus Limited and served as its director and Chief Scientific Officer from 2006 to 2015.

Awards and honours
Rodenburg was elected a Fellow of the Royal Society (FRS) in 2019 for "substantial contributions to the improvement of natural knowledge".

References

Fellows of the Royal Society
1960 births
Living people